El Telégrafo is a Uruguayan newspaper from Paysandú. 
Established on July 1, 1910 by Ángel Carotini and Miguel Arturo Baccaro.
Nowadays it is the oldest circulating newspaper in Uruguay.

Notes

External links
 Website
 Blog with captions

1910 establishments in Uruguay
Mass media in Paysandú
Newspapers established in 1910
Spanish-language newspapers